MES is the common name for the compound 2-(N-morpholino)ethanesulfonic acid. Its chemical structure contains a morpholine ring. It has a molecular weight of 195.2 and the chemical formula is C6H13NO4S. Synonyms include: 2-morpholinoethanesulfonic acid; 2-(4-morpholino)ethanesulfonic acid; 2-(N-morpholino)ethanesulfonic acid; 2-(4-morpholino)ethanesulfonic acid; MES; MES hydrate; and morpholine-4-ethanesulfonic acid hydrate. MOPS is a similar pH buffering compound which contains a propanesulfonic moiety instead of an ethanesulfonic one.

Applications
MES is used as a buffering agent in biology and biochemistry. It has pKa value of 6.15 at 20 °C. The pH (and pKa at ionic strength I≠0) of the buffer solution changes with concentration and temperature, and this effect may be predicted using online calculators. MES is highly soluble in water. The melting point is approx. 300 °C.

MES was developed as one of Good's buffers in the 1960s. These buffers were developed with the following criteria in mind: midrange pKa, maximum water solubility and minimum solubility in all other solvents, minimal salt effects, minimal change in pKa with temperature, chemically and enzymatically stable, minimal absorption in visible or UV spectral range and reasonably easily synthesized. MES is also useful as a non-coordinating buffer in chemistry involving metal ions, as many common buffers (e.g. phosphate and acetate) readily form coordination complexes. MES only weakly binds Ca, Mg, Mn, and it has negligible binding with Cu(II).

Effect of impurities
Commercial preparations of MES (and other sulfonylethyl buffers like BES, CHES, and PIPES) can contain a contaminant oligo(vinylsulfonic acid) (OVS), which is a polyanionic mimic of RNA, and can be a potent (pM) inhibitor of RNA binding proteins and enzymes.

Safety

Contact with this buffer is hazardous; skin or eye exposure should be cleaned well with water and medical aid should be sought in the case of eye exposure, swallowing or inhalation of dust. It also emits toxic fumes upon combustion, including carbon monoxide, nitrogen oxide and sulfur oxides.

See also

CAPS (buffer)
CHES
MOPS
HEPES
HEPPS
Tris
Common buffer compounds used in biology

References

External links
MES on OpenWetWare

Buffer solutions
Sulfonic acids
4-Morpholinyl compunds